Avani is a given name in the English language. It is a popular unisex name in India and Sri Lanka. The name is of Sanskrit origin.

Notable people with the name include:

 Avani Chaturvedi (born 1993), an Indian pilot 
 Avani Davda (born 1980), first CEO of Tata Starbucks
 Avani Dias (born 1991), Sri Lankan-Australian journalist and radio presenter
 Avani Gregg (born 2002), American social media personality and make-up artist
 Avani Modi, Indian actress
 Avani Panchal (born 1991), an Indian professional roller skater

English-language given names
Sinhalese unisex given names